William Davenport may refer to:

 William Davenport (filmmaker) (born 1960), filmmaker, musician, publisher, writer, teacher and autism activist
 William Davenport (magician) (1841–1877), American magician and brother of magician Ira Erastus Davenport  
 William Davenport (scientist) (1772–1823), Irish academic and clergyman
 William N. Davenport (1856–1933), Massachusetts politician
 Willie Davenport (1943–2002), American sprint runner
 William Davenport (slave trader)